Tani Loffa is an Indian politician from Arunachal Pradesh. He belongs to the Bhartiya Janata Party.

In 2004, he was elected from East Kameng district's Seppa West assembly constituency of Arunachal Pradesh.

References

People from Seppa
People from East Kameng district
Arunachal Pradesh MLAs 2004–2009
Living people
Bharatiya Janata Party politicians from Arunachal Pradesh
21st-century Indian politicians
Year of birth missing (living people)
Janata Dal (United) politicians